Neil Hoban (born 4 February 1966) is a British former cyclist. He competed in the road race at the 1988 Summer Olympics.

References

External links
 

1966 births
Living people
British male cyclists
Olympic cyclists of Great Britain
Cyclists at the 1988 Summer Olympics
People from Pembury
Sportspeople from Kent
20th-century British people